The Evangelical-Lutheran Church in Württemberg is a Lutheran member church of the Evangelical Church in Germany in the German former state of Württemberg, now part of the state of Baden-Württemberg.

The seat of the church is in Stuttgart. It is a full member of the Evangelical Church in Germany (EKD), and is a Lutheran Church. The presiding bishop (Landesbischof) of the church is Frank Otfried July (2005). There are four regional bishops (Regionalbischöfe). The regional bishops are located at Heilbronn, Stuttgart, Ulm, and Reutlingen.

The Evangelical Lutheran Church of Württemberg is one of 20 Lutheran, united and reformed churches of the EKD. The church has 1,914,425 members (2020) in about 1,300 parishes. It is the most important Protestant denomination in eastern Baden-Württemberg. The Evangelical Lutheran Church of Württemberg is a member church of the Community of Protestant Churches in Europe. It is a member of the Lutheran World Federation and a guest member of the United Evangelical Lutheran Church of Germany. The Church runs a minister training house in Tübingen called Tübinger Stift. The most prominent churches of the Evangelical Lutheran Church of Württemberg are the Stiftskirche in Stuttgart, the Minster in Ulm, the Kilians church in Heilbronn, the St. Mary's Church, Reutlingen, the city church St. Dionysius in Esslingen, as well as the church St. Michael in Schwäbisch Hall. The ordination of women like in all other EKD churches has been allowed. In March 2019, the Evangelical-Lutheran Church in Württemberg allowed blessing of same-sex unions.

History 

In 1534, Ulrich, Duke of Württemberg enforced the Protestant Reformation in his Duchy of Württemberg. The Duke, who later became the King of Württemberg, was the head of the state church as the summus episcopus, meaning the ruler united secular and religious power in his person. The former Catholic bishops lost all privileges. Johannes Brenz was empowered to reform the state church following the teachings of Martin Luther. He is entombed in the Stuttgart Stiftskirche.

The Evangelical State Church in Württemberg was from the beginning a Lutheran church. However, the form of the church service followed the Reformed tradition, meaning that it is rather plain. The form of the Lutheran church service is hardly ever practised. It is however practised in Hohenzollern.
Huguenots, Hussites and Waldensians immigrants had found refuge the duchy. The Bible Institute was established in Urach the lord of Sonneck, Hans III. Ungnad von Weißenwolff printed 30000 bibles and smuggled over the borders guarded by local hunters. Up to 1806 the Duchy of Württemberg was a purely evangelical territory. Only after Württemberg became a kingdom and, due to Napoleon, larger Catholic territories (Upper Swabia) were added, the uniform religious structure ended. Evangelical parishes have also been established in the former Catholic territories of (southern) Württemberg since the late 19th century.

After the end of World War I, King William II of Württemberg was forced to resign. The church therefore formally had no ruler because his children had also been disqualified for royal succession due to improper marriage. Since the 1890s the head of a Catholic ducal branch line of the royal house has been named as his legitimate successor, but the Lutheran state church could obviously not accept him as summus episcopus. As a result, leading clergymen took over the church. After King William II had died in October 1921, the Evangelical State Church in Württemberg enacted a new constitution in 1923/24 and installed a church president as the leader of the church; in 1933 the leader was given the title Landesbischof.1939 During World War II, YMCA was involved in supporting millions of POWs ."One of the most important tasks of the Y.M.C.A. delegates was, if time permitted, to sit down and talk to the internees about their personal problems and, thereafter, try to establish the contacts with families and friends in the outside world and to secure the items wished for." "Wartime Logs", William Hilsleys Tagebuch eines internierten Musikers

In 1945, the Protestant deanery (Kirchenkreis) of the Evangelical Church of the old-Prussian Union in the Province of Hohenzollern adopted provisional supervision by the Evangelical State Church in Württemberg. On April 1, 1950, the deanery joined the latter church body and terminated its supervision by the prior old-Prussian Ecclesiastical Province of the Rhineland.

The Evangelical State Church in Württemberg hosted the 11th General Assembly of the Lutheran World Federation in Stuttgart, Germany, on 20–27 July 2010.

Leading persons and bishops in history 
 1924–1929: Johannes von Merz, church president
 1929–1948: Theophil Wurm, bishop (until 1933 church president)
 1948–1962: Dr. Martin Haug, bishop
 1962–1969: Dr. Erich Eichele, bishop
 1969–1979: Helmut Claß, bishop
 1979–1988: Hans von Keler, bishop
 1988–1994: Theo Sorg, bishop
 1994–2001: Eberhardt Renz, bishop
 2001–2005: Gerhard Maier, bishop
 2005 – today: Frank Otfried July, bishop

Synod 
The election of the synod is for six years.

Youth 

Child and Youth work is running on the YMCA (CVJM-Gesamtverband). The local state office (Landesstelle) is a free democratic organisation "Evangelisches Jugendwerk in Württemberg "working in order of the Evangelical-Lutheran Church in Württemberg. Trumpet choir (Posaunenchor) groups without age limit may take part in the "Evangelisches Jugendwerk in Württemberg ". The biennial Trombone Choir Day (Landesposaunentag) takes place in Ulm. In 1946, a big crying startet on the song Wachet auf, ruft uns die Stimme. The bishop, Theophil Wurm, could not speak over 12 years, trombone players killed in action WW2, Ulm was destroyed by an air raid, feel great gratitude to be here... "Gloria".

The Überbündische meeting (in short "ÜT") took place in 1977 and 2017 in the Böttingen (Heuberg) courtyard of the evangelical church youth. A total of 3,400 people took part in over 45 different societies and institutions of scouts and the youth movement. A total of 70.000 people attended the European young adults meeting in Stuttgart in 1996. The Parish Youth is working stably on a largely self-organising basis in order of the Evangelical-Lutheran Church in Württemberg, in Tailfingen by the elected youth church council.

Parishioners
1922: 1,668,000 members
2007: 2,286,893 members

Notes

Further reading 

 Henry Söderberg: My Friend William Who Made Music Behind Barbed Wire. In: William Hilsley: Musik hinterm Stacheldraht. Tagebuch eines internierten Musikers 1940–1945. Herausgegeben von Ulrich Bornemann, Karlhans Kluncker und Rénald Ruiter; Verlag für Berlin-Brandenburg, Potsdam 1999, S. 107–109.
 J. Frank Diggs: The Welcome Swede. Vantage Press, New York, 1988, .
 Barbara Stelzl-Marx: Zwischen Fiktion und Zeitzeugenschaft. Amerikanische und sowjetische Kriegsgefangene im Stalag XVII B Krems-Gneixendorf. Narr, Tübingen 2000, .

External links 
  
 International Information
 Online Württemberg Church History 
 Association for Württemberg Church History 
 Evangelic Community Paper of Württemberg 
 Evangelical Church in Germany

 
Baden-Württemberg
History of Württemberg
Wurttemberg
Wurttemberg
Wurttemberg
Wurttemberg